Yüksekova District is a district in the Hakkâri Province of Turkey. Its seat is the city Yüksekova. Its area is 2,547 km2 and had a population of 119,194 people in 2021. It borders Iran to the east, and Kurdistan Region of Iraq to the south.

History 

The district was historically an important trade route location due to its proximity to Iran.

From the 1810s to Sayfo in 1915, the entire population of around the Great Zab was East Syriac Assyrian whose main occupation was agriculture that consisted of wheat, barley, cotton and tea. The local Assyrian population were descendants of people who found refuge among Kurds from the Golden Horde in the early fifteenth century. 

Traveller Soane visisted the district in 1910, describing the area as 'one of the most inaccessible of the many sealed corners of this mountain country'. After the genocide, Assyrian villages were subsequently populated by Kurds.

Settlements

Beldes 
The district encompasses three municipalities:
 Yüksekova
 Büyükçiftlik
 Esendere

Villages 
The district has sixty-two villages of which three are unpopulated:

 Adaklı
 Akalın
 Akçalı
 Akocak
 Akpınar
 Aksu
 Altınoluk
 Armutdüzü
 Aşağıuluyol
 Bağdaş
 Bataklık
 Beşatlı
 Beşbulak
 Bostancık
 Bölük
 Bulaklı
 Çatma
 Çukurca
 Dağlıca
 Dedeler
 Değerli
 Demirkonak
 Dibekli
 Dilekli
 Dilektaşı
 Doğanlı
 Gökyurt
 Güçlü
 Güldalı
 Güllüce
 Gürdere
 Gürkavak
 Ikiyaka
 İnanlı
 Kadıköy
 Kamışlı
 Karabey
 Karlı
 Kazan
 Keçili
 Kısıklı
 Kolbaşı
 Köprücek
 Köşkönü
 Onbaşılar
 Ortaç
 Örnekköy
 Pınargözü
 Pirinçeken
 Salkımlı
 Sarıtaş
 Serindere
 Suüstü
 Sürekli
 Tatlı
 Tuğlu
 Vezirli
 Yazılı
 Yeniışık
 Yeşiltaş
 Yoncalık
 Yürekli

Hamlets 
The district has 104 hamlets.

Climate 
Yüksekova has a continental mediterranean climate (Köppen: Dsb). The winter months are cold and snowy, springs are cool and wet, autumns are mild and crisp, while the summer months are pleasantly warm and dry with cool nights. The average annual temperature is 6.9 °C and precipitation here averages 670 mm.

Gallery

Notable people 

 Hacı Karay (1950–1994)
 Savaş Buldan (1961–1994)
 Abdullah Zeydan (1972–)

References 

Districts of Hakkâri Province